Pseudoleucania ferruginescens is a moth of the family Noctuidae. It is found in Santiago, Valparaíso, Patagonia, Estrecho de Magallanes, Córdoba, La Rioja, Buenos Aires, Tandil, Balcarce, Río Negro, Comodoro Rivadavia, Esquel, Neuquén, Mendoza and Catamarca in Argentina.

Adults are on wing in December.

External links
 Noctuinae of Chile

Noctuinae